Bjørgulv Braanen (born 14 November 1956) was editor-in-chief of the Norwegian daily newspaper Klassekampen until 2018, when he was succeeded by Mari Skurdal.

Career
Braanen is educated as a welder in addition to have studied history at university. He is former chairman of Red Youth and journalist in Klassekampen (1984–1990) and Dagens Næringsliv (1990–2000). In 2000 he returned to Klassekampen, where he was editor-in-chief from 2002 to 2018, and thereafter political editor.

References

1956 births
Living people
Norwegian newspaper editors
Klassekampen people
Dagens Næringsliv people
Klassekampen editors